The 2016 United States presidential election in Kansas was held on Tuesday, November 8, 2016, as part of the 2016 United States presidential election in which all 50 states and the District of Columbia participated. Kansas voters chose electors to represent them in the Electoral College via a popular vote, pitting the Republican Party's nominee, businessman Donald Trump, and running mate Indiana Governor Mike Pence against Democratic Party nominee, former Secretary of State Hillary Clinton, and her running mate Virginia Senator Tim Kaine. Kansas has six electoral votes in the Electoral College.

Trump carried the state with 56.16 percent of the vote, while Clinton received 35.74 percent. Kansas was among eleven states in which Clinton improved on Barack Obama's margin from 2012 (though her vote share was lower than Obama's 38 percent), largely due to a significant shift towards Democrats in Johnson County.

This was the final election of Riley County's 104 year streak of voting Republican, as in the next election Joe Biden would become the first Democrat to win the county in its history. Additionally, since in 2016 Donald Trump became the first Republican to ever win the ancestrally Democratic Elliott County, Kentucky, this is the only election ever in which Elliott County and Riley County voted for the same candidate.

Caucuses

The incumbent President of the United States, Barack Obama, a Democrat and former U.S. Senator from Illinois, was first elected president in the 2008 election, running with then-Senator Joe Biden of Delaware. Defeating the Republican nominee, Senator John McCain of Arizona, with 52.9 percent of the popular vote and 68 percent of the electoral vote, Obama succeeded two-term Republican President George W. Bush, the former Governor of Texas. Obama and Biden were reelected in the 2012 presidential election, defeating former Massachusetts Governor Mitt Romney with 51.1 percent of the popular vote and 61.7 percent of electoral votes. Although Barack Obama's approval rating in the RealClearPolitics poll tracking average remained between 40 percent and 50 percent for most of his second term, it  experienced a surge in early 2016 and reached its highest point since 2012 during June of that year. Analyst Nate Cohn noted that a strong approval rating for Obama would equate to a strong performance for the Democratic candidate, and vice versa.

Following his second term, Obama was not eligible for another reelection. In October 2015, Obama's running-mate and two-term Vice President Biden decided not to enter the race for the Democratic presidential nomination either. With their term expiring on January 20, 2017, the electorate was asked to elect a new president, the 45th president and 48th vice president of the United States, respectively.

Democratic caucuses

Bernie Sanders visited Kansas during the primary season, while Hillary Clinton did not herself and instead sent her daughter Chelsea Clinton to hold a rally in Johnson County.

Republican caucuses

Delegates were awarded to candidates at the statewide and congressional district level who got 10% or more of the vote proportionally. The 3 RNC delegates were awarded to the winner.

General election

Voting History

The state of Kansas has given its electoral votes to the Republican ticket since 1968, and only once to the Democrats (1964) since 1940. At the time, all current statewide officials were Republicans, as were all four members of the state's U.S. House delegation. Mitt Romney defeated Barack Obama by a margin of 60 percent to 38 percent in 2012. A poll conducted by John Zogby found Clinton leading Trump by 7 points in June. In addition, an internal poll for Representative Kevin Yoder, a Republican from Kansas' 3rd congressional district, released an internal poll showing Clinton leading Trump by 6 points in his district. This district voted for Mitt Romney by a 10-point margin in 2012 and has a Cook Partisan Voting Index of R+6. This result, coupled with Clinton's gains in national polls, caused Sabato's Crystal Ball to move the Kansas race from "Safe Republican" to "Likely Republican" on August 18.

Predictions

Polling

Minor candidates
The following received write-in status:

 President: Andrew D. Basiago; Vice President: Karen D. Kinnison
 President: Darrell L Castle; Vice President: Scott N. Bradley
 President: "Rocky" Roque De La Fuente, Vice President: Michael Steinberg
 President: Rocky Giordani; Vice President: Farley M Anderson
 President: James A Hedges; Vice President: Bill V Bayes
 President: Tom Hoefling; Vice President: Steve Schulin
 President: Lynn Kahn; Vice President: Kathy Monahan
 President: Gloria La Riva; Vice President: Eugene Puryer
 President: Michael S. Levinson; Vice President: Perry E. Wharton, II
 President: Michael A Maturen; Vice President: Juan A Munoz
 President: Evan McMullin; Vice President: Nathan D Johnson
 President: Monica G. Moorehead; Vice President: Lamont G. Lilly
 President: Darryl Perry; Vice President: Conan Salada
 President: Marshall R. Schoenke; Vice President: James C. Mitchell, Jr.
 President: Joe C Schriner; Vice President: Joe Moreaux
 President: Mike Smith; Vice President: Daniel White
 President: Timothy Cook; Vice President: John Stein

Results

By county

Results by congressional district
Trump won 3 of the 4 congressional districts, Clinton won 1 that elected Republican.

See also
 United States presidential elections in Kansas
 Presidency of Donald Trump
 2016 Democratic Party presidential debates and forums
 2016 Democratic Party presidential primaries
 2016 Republican Party presidential debates and forums
 2016 Republican Party presidential primaries

References

External links
Kansas Department of Elections
 RNC 2016 Republican Nominating Process 
 Green papers for 2016 primaries, caucuses, and conventions
 Decision Desk Headquarter Results for Kansas

KS
2016
Presidential